Miss Polonia 2019 was the 42nd Miss Polonia pageant, held on November 24, 2019. The winner of Miss Polonia was Karolina Bielawska of Łódź and she represented Poland at Miss World 2021 and became the second woman from Poland   to be crowned Miss World. The 1st Runner-up, Aleksandra Kielan, will represent the country at Miss Charm 2020. 2nd Runner-Up, Karina Nowak, was supposed to represent the country in Miss Grand International 2020 but did not compete for unknown reasons.

Final results

Special Awards

Official Delegates

Notes

Returns
Last competed in 2016:
 Podlasie

Last competed in 2017:
 Lower Silesia
 West Pomerania

Withdrawals
 Lower Poland
 Pomerania
 Subcarpathia

Did not compete
 Holy Cross
 Lubusz
 Opole
 Polish Community in Argentina
 Polish Community in Australia
 Polish Community in Belarus
 Polish Community in Brazil
 Polish Community in Canada
 Polish Community in Czechia
 Polish Community in France
 Polish Community in Germany
 Polish Community in Ireland
 Polish Community in Israel
 Polish Community in Kazakhstan
 Polish Community in Russia
 Polish Community in Slovakia
 Polish Community in South Africa
 Polish Community in Sweden
 Polish Community in Ukraine
 Polish Community in the U.K.
 Polish Community in the U.S.
 Polish Community in Venezuela

References

External links
Official Website

2019
2019 beauty pageants
2019 in Poland